Coffeikokkos is a genus of gall wasp.

Species
 Coffeikokkos copeyensis Pujade-Villar & Melika, 2012
 Coffeikokkos korytkowskii Medianero & Nieves-Aldrey, 2013

References

Cynipidae
Hymenoptera genera

Taxa described in 2012
Gall-inducing insects
Taxa named by Juli Pujade-Villar
Taxa named by George Melika